Rajya Sabha elections were held in 1964, to elect members of the Rajya Sabha, Indian Parliament's upper chamber.

Elections
Elections were held in 1964 to elect members from various states.
The list is incomplete.

Members elected
The following members are elected in the elections held in 1964. They are members for the term 1964-70 and retire in year 1970, except in case of the resignation or death before the term.

State - Member - Party

Bye-elections
The following bye elections were held in the year 1964.

State - Member - Party

 Bihar - Lalit Narayan Mishra  - INC (  ele  18/02/1964 term till 1966 )
 Maharashtra - M C Chagla - INC (  ele  02/03/1964 term till 1966 )
 Nagaland - Melhupra Vero  - INC (  ele  18/03/1964 term till 1968 )
 Nominated - M Amjal Khan - INC (  ele  31/03/1964 term till 1966 )
 Madras - P Thanulingam - INC (  ele  09/07/1964 term till 1968 )
 Rajasthan  - Dalpat Singh - OTH (  ele  26/08/1964 term till 1966 )
 Andhra -  Neelam Sanjiva Reddy - INC (  ele  20/11/1964 term till 1966 )
 Nominated - Prof Siddhantalankar Satyavrata   - NOM (  ele  25/11/1964 term till 1968 )

References

1964 elections in India
1964